Stohr Cars designs and builds racing cars mainly for competition within the Sports Car Club of America. The business was founded by Lee Stohr in 1991 and is based in Denver, NC, USA. 138 racing cars have been produced as of December 2021. Stohr Cars was purchased by Dauntless Racing in 2014.

Origins

After driving an Elden FF for several years in the early 1980s, Lee Stohr designed and built several of his own Formula Fords, Formula Continentals and a Formula 3 type car.  In 2001 Stohr moved into the D Sports Racing class. Their first National Championship came just one year later with a sports racer with Mark Jaremko driving at the SCCA Runoffs at Mid-Ohio.  In 2005 Lee Stohr and Wayne Felch expanded the business with the introduction of a newer, faster WF1.  The company was one of the first to join the new Formula 1000 class in early 2007. In 2014, Stohr Cars was acquired by Dauntless Racing of Vacaville, CA.  In March 2021, Stohr Cars relocated from Vacaville, CA to a new and larger facility in Denver, NC

Racing results
Source:
 2021 SCCA National Champion, P1.  Stohr WF1; Driver: Lee Alexander
 2021 SCCA National Champion, P2.  Stohr WF1; Driver: Tim Day, Jr.
 2020 SCCA National Champion, P2.  Stohr WF1; Driver: Greg Gyann
 2018 SCCA National Champion, P2.  Stohr WF1; Driver: Tim Day, Jr.
 2017 SCCA National Champion, P1.  Stohr WF1; Driver: Jonathan Eriksen
 2017 SCCA National Champion, P2.  Stohr WF1; Driver: Jeff Shafer
 2016 SCCA National Champion, P2.  Stohr WF1; Driver: Jeff Shafer
 2015 SCCA National Champion, P2.  Stohr WF1; Driver: Chris Farrell
 2015 SCCA National Champion, P1.  Stohr WF1; Driver: Gianpolo Ciancimino
 2014 SCCA National Champion, P2.  Stohr 01D; Driver: Fabian Okonski
 2014 SCCA National Champion, P1.  Stohr WF1; Driver: Chris Farrell
 2013 Australian National Champion, Sports Racer. Stohr WF1; Driver: Adam Proctor
 2013 Grassroots Motorsport magazine, Track Day Car of the Year, Stohr WF1 
 2013 SCCA National Champion, D Sports Racing.  Stohr WF1; Driver: Chris Farrell
 2013 SCCA National Champion, C Sports Racing.  Stohr WF1; Driver: Lee Alexander
 2012 Australian National Champion, Sports Racer. Stohr WF1; Driver: Adam Proctor
 2011 Australian National Champion, Sports Racer. Stohr WF1; Driver: Adam Proctor
 2011 SCCA National Champion, D Sports Racing.  Stohr WF1; Driver: Tom Bootz
 2010 SCCA National Champion, D Sports Racing.  Stohr WF1; Driver: Lawrence Loshak
 2009 SCCA National Champion, D Sports Racing.  Stohr WF1; Driver: Gary Crook
 2008 SCCA National Champion, D Sports Racing.  Stohr WF1; Driver: JR Osborne
 2008 SCCA National Champion, C Sports Racing.  Stohr WF1; Driver: JR Osborne
 2007 SCCA National Champion, D Sports Racing.  Stohr WF1; Driver: JR Osborne
 2006 SCCA National Champion, D Sports Racing.  Stohr WF1; Driver: Mark Jaremko
 2005 SCCA National Champion, D Sports Racing.  Stohr WF1; Driver: Mark Jaremko
 2004 SCCA National Champion, D Sports Racing.  Stohr DSR; Driver: John Hill
 2003 SCCA National Champion, D Sports Racing.  Stohr DSR; Driver: Mark Jaremko
 2002 SCCA National Champion, D Sports Racing.  Stohr DSR; Driver: Mark Jaremko

Cars

References

External links 
 Dauntless Racing
 The Official Site of Stohr Cars
 StohrDesign consultancy

American racecar constructors
Automotive motorsports and performance companies
Manufacturing companies based in San Francisco